These are the results of the 2013 Central American and Caribbean Championships in Athletics which took place on July 5–7 in Morelia, Mexico.

Men's results

100 meters

HeatsWind:Heat 1: +3.0 m/s, Heat 2: +1.7 m/s, Heat 3: +1.2 m/s, Heat 4: +1.4 m/s

FinalWind:+0.5 m/s

200 meters

HeatsWind:Heat 1: -0.1 m/s, Heat 2: +0.3 m/s, Heat 3: -0.9 m/s, Heat 4: -0.3 m/s, Heat 5: -1.2 m/s

FinalWind:+0.5 m/s

400 meters

Heats

Final

800 meters

1500 meters

5000 meters

10,000 meters

110 meters hurdles

HeatsWind:Heat 1: +1.9 m/s, Heat 2: +1.1 m/s

FinalWind:-3.4 m/s

400 meters hurdles

Heats

Final

3000 meters steeplechase

4 × 100 meters relay
Heats

Final

4 × 400 meters relay

20 kilometers walk

High jump

Pole vault

Long jump

Triple jump

Shot put

Discus throw

Hammer throw

Javelin throw

Decathlon

Women's results

100 meters

HeatsWind:Heat 1: +0.3 m/s, Heat 2: +1.2 m/s, Heat 3: +1.2 m/s

FinalWind:+0.1 m/s

200 meters

HeatsWind:Heat 1: -0.2 m/s, Heat 2: -0.1 m/s, Heat 3: +0.2 m/s

FinalWind:-0.6 m/s

400 meters

Heats

Final

800 meters

1500 meters

5000 meters

10,000 meters

100 meters hurdles
Wind: -1.5 m/s

400 meters hurdles

3000 meters steeplechase

4 × 100 meters relay

4 × 400 meters relay

10,000 meters walk

High jump

Pole vault

Long jump

Triple jump

Shot put

Discus throw

Hammer throw

Javelin throw

Heptathlon

References
Results

Central American and Caribbean Championships in Athletics
Events at the Central American and Caribbean Championships in Athletics